The Jackson Prairie is a   temperate grassland ecoregion in Mississippi.  It is a disjunct of the Black Belt (or Black Prairie)  physiographic area.

Description
The prairie is a narrow strip across the state from the Mississippi River to the border of Alabama. It runs in a diagonal line from near Jackson in the northwest, through Bienville National Forest and southeast to the Alabama border.

The contrast between the alkaline soil of the prairies and the acidic soil of the forests causes the sharp delineation in plant types in each region.  In the western portion of the prairie, the soil is a brown loess loam over calcareous clay.  In hilly areas, the clay is covered by red and yellow sand from the Pliocene epoch.  The underlying clay, an identifying component of the Jackson Prairie Belt, shrinks and swells dramatically based on the amount of rainwater.  Each cycle adds to the mounds and depressions, building them up over time.

The prairies depend on periodic outbreaks of fire to keep the forest from overgrowing the prairie.

Flora and fauna
The prairie used to support quantities of bobwhite quail (Colinus virginianus), eastern wild turkey (Meleagris gallopavo silvestris), and a variety of songbird species.

Conservation
Because of the soil and climate, this ecoregion is ideally suited for farming, leading to most of the prairie being converted into farmland and crop agriculture. There are a few remaining sections in the Bienville National Forest, including the largest remaining undisturbed portion at the Harrell Prairie Botanical Area.

The Grassland Reserve Program of 2002 enabled agencies to purchase conservation easements to protect prairies.

See also
 Harrell Prairie Botanical Area
 Texas blackland prairies

References

Temperate grasslands, savannas, and shrublands
Grasslands of Mississippi